The APA Building was a skyscraper in Melbourne, Victoria, Australia; at 12 storeys and 53m to the tip of its corner spire, it was the tallest commercial building in Australia at the time of its construction in 1888–90, later reputed (erroneously) to have been the world's tallest at the time.

Originally known as the Australian Building (and also known as the Australian Property Investment Co or API Building), it was located at 49 Elizabeth Street, on the corner of Flinders Lane in Melbourne, and was notable for the way the Queen Anne style design lent it very vertical proportionals, enhanced by the steep roof, spires and gables of the top floors. It was Australia's tallest building until 1912, when it was surpassed by Culwulla Chambers in Sydney, and remained Melbourne's tallest until 1929.

It was demolished in 1980.

History
In the 1880s Melbourne was in the throes of the land boom, fueled by easy credit and steep increases in the price of land, especially in the central city. Built by the Australian Property Investment Co, (or API), the announcement of the construction noted that it was said to be taller than any private building in London at the time, and would stand amongst the tallest in New York City and Chicago. It was reputed to have been originally planned to have fifteen stories (and an 1888 sketch shows an equally large building in the same style next door), but it was built with 12 levels, the 12th one attic space and a caretakers flat. The project was the brainchild of one of the directors of the API company, businessman and politician F T Derham, who had paid £65,000 for the site; the API then borrowed £400,000 for the construction from the London based Home and Colonial Assets Corporation Ltd.

The API called a limited competition in November 1887, which was won Henry Hardie Kemp; at the time he was working at Terry & Oakden (partner Leonard Terry had died some years previously), where he was soon taken on as a partner, along with another senior architect, to form Oakden, Addison & Kemp. John Beswicke, who had worked for one of the API directors previously, had also been invited to submit, and was retained as an associate in the project as he had studied tall buildings, and is thought to have provided technical advice.  Construction began in 1888, and was completed some time in mid 1890.

The Australian Building was constructed by local builder James Anderson who was a prominent member of The Builders and Contractors Association of Victoria. He built many notable buildings in Melbourne including the Hawthorn Town Hall, which still stands. Most others have been demolished.

The Australian Building was one of about 11 'massive edifices' of 8 to 10 floors built in the city at the height of the boom, of which only two survive. They were made possible by the introduction of an hydraulic power system of pressurised water that could operate the lifts to great heights 'in complete safety'. They did not employ any new structural technologies however, relying on thick walls of load bearing brickwork, and internal structures of cast iron, wrought iron and timber. With the boom soon turning into a crash, these buildings remained the tallest for many years, and in 1916 a new building regulation was passed limiting buildings to 132 ft (40m).

The building inevitably generated its own legends, for instance that three companies went broke sinking the 40m deep cylinders for the hydraulic lift pole, and that not long after completion, the bolt on one of the cylinders broke, sending the fortunately vacant lift speeding downwards. Another from 1945 is that on the day of official inspection, the lift shot up uncontrollably only to bounce back from springs at the top, prompting many of the party to use the stairs on the way down. The main legend is that it was the worlds tallest in 1890, for instance in the 1976 book Melbourne's Yesterdays, but there were a number of towers in New York City and Chicago in that year that exceeded it by at least one or two floors, plus architectural features.

Its great height and dominance in the streetscape led to it being the subject of many photographs and postcards in its first 20 years.

In 1920 the Australian Provincial Assurance Association, an insurance company, bought the building as its Melbourne base, and then renamed it the APA Building.

The APA was Australia's tallest building until 1912, when the Culwalla Chambers was built in Sydney. This office building was constructed of reinforced concrete, and had 12 full office floors, with a facade height of 59m.

The APA Building was Melbourne's tallest commercial building for 40 years, until the company decided to move, and purchased and remodelled another nine storey Victorian 'skyscraper' on the southeast corner of Collins and Queen Streets as its new headquarters, adding a very tall tower (largely for show) in 1929, which topped out at 76 m (250 ft). This was also known as the APA Building, and was demolished in the late 1960s.  Some time in the 1950s, the spire, turrets and gables of the top floors of the earlier APA Building were removed, leaving it with a truncated mansard roof.

By the late 1970s, its historic importance was recognised despite its alteration, and it was classified by the National Trust in 1978. It was also listed by the then Historic Buildings Preservation Council (now Heritage Victoria), but the owners then successfully argued for a demolition permit, on the basis of the large cost of upgrading to meet modern fire regulations. It was demolished in mid 1980, and replaced by a five-story office building.

Architectural Style
The building was designed by the architecture firm of Oakden, Addison & Kemp in association with John Beswicke. The design has strong influences of the English Queen Anne revival, then a new style in Melbourne. This is seen in the use of red-brick with rendered stripes, and the picturesque turreted and gabled roofscape.

Claims to height

The APA Building has been variously claimed to be the tallest (or the third or fourth tallest) in the world in 1889, when in fact it was perhaps a distant sixth or seventh or more. Measured drawings held at the State Library of Victoria from 1980 show that it had 11 occupy-able floors, and a 12th attic floor with a caretakers flat, while plans reproduced in a thesis at the University of Melbourne show it had a roof height at the 11th floor at 41.5m, roof height of the top attic floor of 47m, and to top of the spire was 51m. This is lower than, but comparable to a number of buildings in New York City and Chicago, built in that year or earlier.

It was only amongst the tallest in the world for 6 to 12 months, as towers in Chicago and New York continued to climb higher.

Gallery

See also
 Architecture of Melbourne

References

Bibliography
 Granville Wilson, Peter Sands, Building a city: 100 years of Melbourne architecture, Oxford University Press (originally from the University of California), 1981.

Office buildings completed in 1889
Buildings and structures demolished in 1980
Former skyscrapers
Elizabeth Street, Melbourne
Buildings and structures in Melbourne City Centre
Demolished buildings and structures in Melbourne
1889 establishments in Australia
1980 disestablishments in Australia